Veronica Toro Arana (born 5 August 1994) is a Puerto Rican rower. She competed in the 2020 Summer Olympics.

Toro Arana went to study at the Massachusetts Institute of Technology in 2012 where she received a BS degree in Biological Engineering in 2016. Subsequently, she is studying for an MD degree at Stanford University School of Medicine.

References

1994 births
Living people
Sportspeople from San Juan, Puerto Rico
Sportspeople from Miami
Rowers at the 2020 Summer Olympics
Puerto Rican female rowers
Olympic rowers of Puerto Rico
Massachusetts Institute of Technology alumni
Pan American Games competitors for Puerto Rico
Rowers at the 2019 Pan American Games